David Jambor (born 31 March 2003) is a Czech footballer who currently plays as a midfielder for MFK Vyškov on loan from FC Zbrojovka Brno. His older brother Dan Jambor is also footballer.

Club career

FC Zbrojovka Brno
He made his professional debut for Zbrojovka Brno in the away match against Fastav Zlín on 13 September 2020, which ended in a loss 1:3. After 74 minutes he replaced Adam Fousek.

Career statistics

Club

References

External links
 Profile at FC Zbrojovka Brno official site
 Profile at FAČR official site

2003 births
Living people
Czech footballers
FC Zbrojovka Brno players
Association football midfielders
People from Nové Město na Moravě
Czech Republic youth international footballers
Sportspeople from the Vysočina Region